Emery Welshman (born 9 November 1991) is a professional footballer who most recently played as a forward for Forge FC of the Canadian Premier League. Born in Canada, Welshman represents the Guyana national team.

Club career

Early career
Welshman attended Siena College of the Metro Atlantic Athletic Conference his freshman and sophomore years in college. He was named the MAAC rookie of the year in 2009 after recording 6 goals and 3 assists. His stellar sophomore season saw him jump onto the national stage after recording 13 goals and 3 assists in only 16 games played. He was awarded MAAC offensive player of the year award, all MAAC first team honors and all Region first team honors. He transferred to Oregon State University of the Pac-12 Conference for his final two years of college. He was named to the All-Pac-12 first team after his junior year in 2011 after recording 3 goals and 7 assists. He was again named to the All-Pac-12 first team his senior year after recording 10 goals and 4 assists. He was one of 54 seniors invited to the 2013 MLS Combine.

Toronto FC
Welshman was drafted sixteenth overall in the 2013 MLS SuperDraft by Toronto FC. He made his debut for Toronto as a second half sub in a 1–0 away defeat to Vancouver Whitecaps FC. He started and played the full 90 in Toronto's 2–0 home leg victory against Montreal Impact in the 2013 Canadian Championship. After failing to make another senior team appearance Welshman was released by Toronto in February 2014.

Sigma FC
He spent 2014 playing for Sigma FC in League1 Ontario.

Real Salt Lake
In February 2015, Welshman joined the preseason camp of Real Salt Lake as a trialist.  He ultimately signed with their reserve team, Real Monarchs.

In January 2016, Welshman was promoted and signed a deal with Real Salt Lake. His contract option was declined at the end of the 2016 MLS season.

Puerto Rico FC
Welshman joined Puerto Rico FC ahead of the 2017 NASL season.

FC Cincinnati
On January 3, 2018, Welshman signed a contract with USL side FC Cincinnati. On May 16, 2018, Welshman scored his first professional hat-trick in a 4–1 victory over Detroit City FC in the second round of the 2018 U.S. Open Cup. He re-signed with the club ahead of their entry into MLS for the 2019 season on December 10, 2018.

Loan to Forge FC
Cincinnati loaned Welshman to Forge FC of the Canadian Premier League for the 2019 CPL season on March 8, 2019. He was recalled from his loan on August 2, and his contract with Cincinnati was terminated by mutual consent.

Hapoel Haifa
In August 2019, Welshman signed with Hapoel Haifa of the Israeli Premier League.

Bnei Sakhnin
On 23 January 2020 signed with Bnei Sakhnin.

Return to Forge FC
On September 14, 2021, he re-joined Forge FC in the Canadian Premier League. He won his second league title with the club in 2022 (after winning one in his first stint in 2019).

International career
Welshman is eligible for Guyana through his parents. In January 2015 it was reported that he was invited by Guyana coach Jamaal Shabazz to an upcoming  training camp ahead of a match against Barbados. He made his debut on February 1 against Barbados and scored a goal.

In Guyana's final match of the CONCACAF Nations League qualifying tournament,  Welshman scored the match winner against Belize, sending the nation to the CONCACAF Gold Cup for the first time in their history. In May 2019, he was named to Guyana's provisional squad for the Gold Cup. He was named to the final squad on May 30.

Career statistics

Club

International

International goals
Scores and results list Guyana's goal tally first.

References

External links

 
 
 
 Emery Welshman at FC Cincinnati
 

1991 births
Living people
Association football forwards
Canadian soccer players
Guyanese footballers
Soccer players from Mississauga
Canadian sportspeople of Guyanese descent
Black Canadian soccer players
Oregon State Beavers men's soccer players
Siena Saints men's soccer players
Portland Timbers U23s players
Toronto FC draft picks
Toronto FC players
Sigma FC players
Real Monarchs players
Real Salt Lake players
FC Cincinnati (2016–18) players
FC Cincinnati players
Forge FC players
Hapoel Haifa F.C. players
Bnei Sakhnin F.C. players
Hapoel Ra'anana A.F.C. players
USL League Two players
Major League Soccer players
League1 Ontario players
USL Championship players
North American Soccer League players
Canadian Premier League players
Israeli Premier League players
Liga Leumit players
Canadian expatriate soccer players
Guyanese expatriate footballers
Expatriate soccer players in the United States
Canadian expatriate sportspeople in the United States
Guyanese expatriate sportspeople in the United States
Expatriate footballers in Israel
Guyanese expatriate sportspeople in Israel
Canadian expatriate sportspeople in Israel
Guyana international footballers
2019 CONCACAF Gold Cup players